Rajesh Cherthala (born 9 July 1978) is a musician and flutist from Cherthala, Kerala, in India, who has been recorded on more than 150 Indian film songs. He is known for his live performances of fusion music incorporating a variety of genres like Western, Carnatic and Hindustani.

Personal life 
Rajesh was born as eldest son of Cherthala Math Dasappan and Nirmala in Cherthala, Alappuzha district, Kerala. He studied at St. Mathews High School, Kannankara and SN College, Cherthala. His parents encouraged him to learn music in his childhood days. 

His wife is Raji Rajesh. hey have two daughters Amala. R.Das and Amrutha.R.Das.

Career 
His first teacher was an artist named 'Sunbright' from Puthanangadi, Cherthala. Pandit Hariprasad Chaurasia is his Guru now. He studies flute at Chaurasya's Vrindavan Gurukul in Mumbai, staying with him. His first studio recording was that conducted by violinist Thiruvizha Ullas at Kalabhavan Kochi, Rajesh was introduced into cinema by Jassie Gift, one of the well-known Malayalam playback singers from Kerala, in 2004. Later, he went on to play for over 300 films, completing more than 1,000 songs (not to include the albums).

Filmography 
Rajesh performed as an instrumentalist for the following films:

Television Episodes 

 Comedy Super Nite – 2

Awards 

 Baba Alexander New Delhi honoring Social Activist Award 2017
Radio Mrchi Award

References

External links
Official Website

Indian flautists
People from Kerala
Carnatic instrumentalists
Venu players
Living people
1978 births